The 1979 Canada rugby union tour of England, Wales and France was a series of six matches played by the Canada national rugby union team in England, Wales and France in September 1979. The Canadian team won three of their tour matches, drew one and lost the other two. The team designated France 'A' was effectively the France national rugby union team.

Matches
Scores and results list Canada's points tally first.

Touring party
Manager: P. C. Clarke
Assistant manager: B. L. Howe
Captain: Mike Luke

Backs

Anthony Bauer
Andrew Bibby
Robbie Greig
Garry Hirayama
Spence McTavish
Dennis Quigley
Chuck Shergold
Patrick Trelawney
Preston Wiley
Keith Wilkinson
William Taylor
E. A Zinkan

Forwards

Don Carson
Hans de Goede
Jim Donaldson
Christoper Fowler
Gary Grant
Ro Hindson
Mike Luke
Ron McInnes
Kenneth Peace
Raymond Rogers
Robin Russell
Dave Sinnott
Dwaine Van Eeuwen

Notes

References

Canada rugby union tour
Canada national rugby union team tours
Rugby union tours of England
Rugby union tours of Wales
tour
tour
tour
tour
Rugby union tours of France